Dashtobod is a city in Jizzakh Region, Uzbekistan. It is part of Zomin District. Its population is 36,500 (2016). From 1974 to the early 1990s the city was known as Ulyanovo.

References

Populated places in Jizzakh Region
Cities in Uzbekistan